In the U.S. state of Connecticut, a borough is an incorporated section of a town. Borough governments are not autonomous and are subordinate to the government of the town to which they belong. For example, Fenwick is a borough in Old Saybrook. A borough is a clearly defined municipality and provides some municipal services, such as police and fire services, garbage collection, street lighting and maintenance, management of cemeteries, and building code enforcement. Other municipal services not provided by the borough are provided by the parent town. Connecticut boroughs are administratively similar to villages in New York. Borough elections are held biennially in odd years on the first Monday in May.

Historical background
Bridgeport (now a separate city) was the state's first borough, formed in 1800 or 1801 as a subdivision of the town of Stratford. Numerous additional boroughs were established thereafter, mostly during the 19th century, to serve a variety of local governmental purposes. There were 18 boroughs in the state as of 1850 and a total of 26 as of 1910. Most Connecticut boroughs have subsequently disincorporated or have become cities. An example of a former borough is Willimantic located in the Town of Windham.  It was originally incorporated as a borough in 1833, re-incorporated as a city in 1893 and in 1983 was dis-incorporated becoming a special service district within the town of Windham under the town's governmental control.

List of boroughs
As of 2016, there are nine boroughs in Connecticut, four of which share the name of the town in which they are located.  Of the current boroughs, one (Naugatuck) is consolidated with its town. Litchfield is the only town to have two incorporated boroughs located within its limits.  Below is a list of boroughs that have existed ordered by date of incorporation. Currently existing boroughs are indicated in boldface.

See also 
 Administrative divisions of Connecticut
 Borough

References

Further reading
C.H. Carter, "Connecticut boroughs", New Haven Colony Historical Society Papers, Vol. IV (1886), p. 149
N.M. Schoonmaker, The Actual Government of Connecticut, (National Woman Suffrage Publishing, 1919)
C.H. Douglas, The Government of the People of the State of Connecticut, (Hinds, Hayden and Eldredge, 1917)
Various editions of the Connecticut State Register and Manual
R.A. Ferry, "A short directory of the names, past and current of Connecticut boroughs", (Connecticut Ancestry Society, 1996)
W.E. Buckley and C.E. Perry, "Connecticut, the state and its government", (Oxford Book Co., 1948)

Local government in Connecticut
Connecticut geography-related lists